Julio Cesar Rodrigues de Souza (born November 16, 1980 in São Paulo, Brazil ) is a Brazilian professional football player who currently plays for Yangon United Football Club.

Career
He is well known in the Malaysian League and was once the winner of Malaysia Super League 2005 golden boot with 18 goals.

Notes

1980 births
Living people
Brazilian footballers
Expatriate footballers in Romania
Londrina Esporte Clube players
Expatriate footballers in Myanmar
Busan IPark players
K League 1 players
Expatriate footballers in South Korea
Santa Cruz Futebol Clube players
Expatriate footballers in Malaysia
Sabah F.C. (Malaysia) players
Expatriate footballers in Indonesia
Perlis FA players
Brazilian expatriate footballers
Persiba Balikpapan players
Brazilian expatriate sportspeople in Malaysia
Association football midfielders
Brazilian expatriate sportspeople in Romania
Footballers from São Paulo
Brazilian expatriate sportspeople in Indonesia
Brazilian expatriate sportspeople in South Korea
Association football forwards